Septimus Collinson (11 September 1739 – 24 January 1827) was provost of Queen's College, Oxford.

Collinson was the seventh son of Joseph and Agnes Collinson, was born at Gotree, near Hunsonby, Cumberland. He was brought up at Great Musgrave, Westmoreland, where his parents had purchased a small estate. He began his studies at Appleby Grammar School, and then went to Queen's College, Oxford, graduating B.A. in 1763 and M.A. in 1767 (Cat. of Oxford Graduates, ed. 1851, p. 142). In 1778 he was presented to the rectories of Dowlish Wake and Dowlish West, Somersetshire. He graduated B.D. in 1792, and D.D. in 1793. For some years he was one of the city lecturers at Oxford.

In 1794 he accepted the college living of Holwell, Dorsetshire, but remained there only about two years, as in 1796 he was appointed provost of Queen's College on the death of Dr. Thomas Fothergill. In 1798 he obtained the Lady Margaret professorship of Divinity at Oxford, to which is annexed a prebend of Worcester Cathedral. His lectures on the Thirty-nine Articles, though much admired at the time of their delivery, have never been printed. He was a frequent preacher before the university. He died at the college lodge on 24 January 1827.

References

Attribution

1739 births
1827 deaths
People from Cumberland
18th-century English educators
19th-century English educators
People from Westmorland
English theologians
18th-century English Christian theologians
19th-century English Christian theologians
Alumni of The Queen's College, Oxford
Lady Margaret Professors of Divinity
Provosts of The Queen's College, Oxford
People from Eden District